The 1977 NBA draft was the 31st annual draft of the National Basketball Association (NBA). The draft was held on June 10, 1977, before the 1977–78 season. In this draft, 22 NBA teams took turns selecting amateur U.S. college basketball players and other eligible players, including international players. The first two picks in the draft belonged to the teams that finished last in each conference, with the order determined by a coin flip. The Milwaukee Bucks won the coin flip and were awarded the first overall pick, while the Kansas City Kings, who obtained the New York Nets first-round pick in a trade, were awarded the second pick. The remaining first-round picks and the subsequent rounds were assigned to teams in reverse order of their win–loss record in the previous season. A player who had finished his four-year college eligibility was eligible for selection. If a player left college early, he would not be eligible for selection until his college class graduated. Before the draft, six college underclassmen were declared eligible for selection under the "hardship" rule. These players had applied and gave evidence of financial hardship to the league, which granted them the right to start earning their living by starting their professional careers earlier. Four former American Basketball Association (ABA) franchises who joined the NBA when both leagues merged, the Denver Nuggets, the Indiana Pacers, the New York Nets and the San Antonio Spurs, took part in the NBA Draft for the first time. Prior to the start of the season, the Nets relocated to New Jersey and became the New Jersey Nets. The draft consisted of 8 rounds comprising the selection of 170 players.

Draft selections and draftee career notes
Kent Benson from Indiana University was selected first overall by the Milwaukee Bucks. Walter Davis from the University of North Carolina, who went on to win the Rookie of the Year Award in his first season, was selected fifth by the Phoenix Suns. Davis was also selected to both the All-NBA Team and the All-Star Game in his first season. He collected a total of six All-NBA Team selections and two All-Star Game selections. Three other players from this draft, second pick Otis Birdsong, third pick Marques Johnson and seventh pick Bernard King, were also selected to both the All-NBA Team and the All-Star Game. Birdsong was selected to four All-NBA Teams and one All-Star Game; Johnson was selected to five All-NBA Teams and three All-Star Games; and King was selected to four All-NBA Teams and four All-Star Games. Jack Sikma, the eighth pick, won the NBA championship with the Seattle SuperSonics in 1979 and was selected to seven consecutive All-Star Games. Rickey Green, the 16th pick, Norm Nixon, the 22nd pick, and Eddie Johnson, the 49th pick, are the only other players from this draft who were selected to an All-Star Game. Two players drafted went on to have coaching careers in the NBA: 33rd pick Eddie Jordan and 53rd pick John Kuester. Jordan has coached three teams in nine seasons, including five seasons with the Washington Wizards.

In the seventh round, the New Orleans Jazz selected Lusia Harris, a female college basketball star from Delta State University, with the 137th pick. She became the second woman ever drafted by an NBA team, after Denise Long, who was selected by the San Francisco Warriors in the 1969 Draft. However, the league voided the Warriors' selection, thus Harris became the first and only woman to ever be officially drafted. Harris did not express an interest to play in the NBA and declined to try out for the Jazz. It was later revealed that she was pregnant at the time, which made her unable to attend the Jazz's training camp, even if she had wanted to. She never played in the NBA but she later played briefly in the Women's Professional Basketball League. In 1992, she was inducted to the Basketball Hall of Fame and became the first woman ever inducted to the Hall of Fame. She was also part of the inaugural class of inductees of the Women's Basketball Hall of Fame in 1999.

Also in the seventh round, the Kansas City Kings selected track and field athlete Caitlyn Jenner (then known as Bruce) with the 139th pick (needling the cross-town Kansas City Chiefs, who would often claim to select the "best athlete available" in the NFL Draft). Jenner had just won the gold medal for decathlon at the 1976 Olympic Games, but had not actually played basketball since high school. Jenner was presented with a Kings jersey bearing the number 8618 (her Olympics decathlon score), but she never appeared in a game. (The closest Jenner would come to a basketball career was a few years later in the film Can't Stop The Music, in a sequence where she shot hoops with her co-stars The Village People.)

Key

Draft

Other picks

The following list includes other draft picks who have appeared in at least one NBA game.

Trades
 On September 10, 1976, the Kansas City Kings acquired Jim Eakins, Brian Taylor, 1977 and 1978 first-round picks from the New York Nets in exchange for Nate Archibald. The Kings used the pick to draft Otis Birdsong.
 On the draft-day, the Chicago Bulls re-acquired their first-round pick from the Buffalo Braves, while the Braves re-acquired their second-round pick from the Bulls. Previously, the Braves acquired Swen Nater and the Bulls' pick on June 7, 1977, from the Milwaukee Bucks in exchange for the Braves' first-round pick. Previously, the Bucks acquired the Bulls' pick on November 2, 1976, from the Braves in exchange for Jim Price. Previously, the Braves acquired the Bulls' pick on November 27, 1975, from the Bulls in exchange for Jack Marin. Previously, the Bulls acquired Matt Guokas, the Braves' pick and a second-round pick on September 4, 1974, from the Braves in exchange for Bob Weiss. The Bucks used the Braves' first-round pick to draft Marques Johnson.
 On January 20, 1977, the Washington Bullets acquired Tom Henderson and a first-round pick from the Atlanta Hawks in exchange for Truck Robinson and a first-round pick. Previously, the Bullets acquired Dave Bing and the pick on August 28, 1975, from the Detroit Pistons in exchange for Kevin Porter. The Bullets used the pick to draft Greg Ballard. The Hawks used the pick to draft Tree Rollins.
 On August 5, 1976, the Los Angeles Lakers acquired 1977, 1978 and 1979 first-round picks, and a 1980 second-round pick from the New Orleans Jazz in exchange for a 1978 first-round pick and a 1977 second-round pick. This trade was arranged as compensation when the Jazz signed Gail Goodrich on July 19, 1976. The Lakers used the pick to draft Kenny Carr. The Jazz used the pick to draft Essie Hollis.
 On February 1, 1977, the New York Nets acquired Darnell Hillman and a first-round pick from the Indiana Pacers in exchange for John Williamson. The Nets used the pick to draft Bernard King.
 On May 25, 1977, the Denver Nuggets acquired Brian Taylor and the ninth pick from the Kansas City Kings in exchange for Tommy Burleson and a second-round pick. Previously, the Nuggets acquired Tommy Burleson, Bob Wilkerson and the second-round pick from the Seattle SuperSonics on May 24, 1977, in exchange for Paul Silas, Marvin Webster and Willie Wise. Previously, the Chicago Bulls acquired the second-round pick and a 1976 third-round pick from the Kings on December 8, 1975, in exchange for Matt Guokas. The Nuggets used the pick to draft Tom LaGarde. The Bulls used the pick to draft Steve Sheppard.
 On January 13, 1977, the Milwaukee Bucks acquired Rowland Garrett, 1977 and 1978 first-round picks from the Cleveland Cavaliers in exchange for Elmore Smith and Gary Brokaw. The Bucks used the pick to draft Ernie Grunfeld.
 On November 16, 1976, the Los Angeles Lakers acquired a first-round pick from the San Antonio Spurs in exchange for Mack Calvin. The Lakers used the pick to draft Brad Davis.
 On January 18, 1977, the Golden State Warriors acquired a first-round pick from the Buffalo Braves in exchange for George Johnson. Previously, the Braves acquired the pick and a 1978 first-round pick from the Houston Rockets on October 24, 1976, in exchange for Moses Malone. The Warriors used the pick to draft Wesley Cox.
 On November 30, 1976, the Chicago Bulls acquired a second-round pick from the New York Nets in exchange for Bob Love. The Bulls used the pick to draft Mike Glenn.
 On December 8, 1976, the Philadelphia 76ers acquired 1977 and 1978 second-round picks from the Milwaukee Bucks in exchange for Fred Carter. The 76ers used the pick to draft Wilson Washington.
 On October 1, 1976, the New York Knicks acquired a second-round pick from the Atlanta Hawks in exchange for Randy Denton. The Knicks used the pick to draft Glen Gondrezick.
 On August 5, 1976, the Milwaukee Bucks acquired a second-round pick from the Buffalo Braves in exchange for the seventh pick in the ABA dispersal draft. Previously, the Braves acquired the pick the Phoenix Suns on August 25, 1976, in exchange for Tom Van Arsdale. The Bucks used the pick to draft Glenn Williams.
 On June 3, 1976, the Portland Trail Blazers acquired a 1977 second-round pick from the New Orleans Jazz in exchange for a 1976 second-round pick. The Blazers used the pick to draft Kim Anderson.
 On June 9, 1977, the Houston Rockets acquired 1977 and 1978 second-round picks from the Boston Celtics in exchange for John Johnson. The Rockets used the pick to draft Larry Moffett.
 On August 5, 1976, the Philadelphia 76ers acquired a second-round pick from the Denver Nuggets in exchange for Roland Taylor. The 76ers used the pick to draft Herm Harris.
 On August 5, 1976, the Los Angeles Lakers acquired a third-round pick from the Buffalo Braves in exchange for Johnny Neumann. The Lakers used the pick to draft James Edwards.
 On October 8, 1973, the Atlanta Hawks acquired a 1976 second-round pick and a 1977 third-round pick from the Phoenix Suns in exchange for Bob Christian. The Hawks used the pick to draft Eddie Johnson.
 On November 27, 1974, the Phoenix Suns acquired a 1976 second-round pick and a 1977 third-round pick from the Los Angeles Lakers in exchange for Corky Calhoun. The Suns used the pick to draft Mike Bratz.

Early entrants

College underclassmen
The following college basketball players successfully applied for early draft entrance.

  Kenny Carr – F, NC State (junior)
  Brad Davis – G, Maryland (junior)
  Ray Epps – F, Norfolk State (junior)
  Bernard King – F, Tennessee (junior)
  Larry Moffett – F, UNLV (junior)
  James Redwine – G, Eastern Washington (freshman)
  Ray Tatum – F, Malone (junior)

Notes

See also
 List of first overall NBA draft picks

References
General

Specific

External links
NBA.com
NBA.com: NBA Draft History

Draft
National Basketball Association draft
NBA draft
NBA draft
1970s in Manhattan
Basketball in New York City
Sporting events in New York City
Sports in Manhattan
Madison Square Garden